Kenneth Buckley (1906–1982) was a British actor.

Selected filmography
 The Minstrel Boy (1937)
 Night Ride (1937)
 Holiday's End (1937)
 Behind Your Back (1937)
 The Second Mr. Bush (1940)
 School for Secrets (1946)
 Master of Bankdam (1947)

References

External links

1906 births
1982 deaths
English male film actors
Male actors from Oldham
20th-century English male actors